Queen Sinmok of the Gyeongju Kim clan (신목왕후 김씨; 655 – 1 June 700), was the queen regent of Silla between 692 and 700.

She was the second wife of king Sinmun of Silla and the mother of king Hyoso of Silla. She ruled as regent during the minority of her son between 692 and 700.

She was called Mother King (母王) by Japan. The expression literally shows that she was the ‘King as a mother’, which is a fine proof of showing that she was the actual ruler of Silla after the death of her husband.

Family
 Father - Kim Heum-woon (김흠운, 金歆運) (? - 655); first husband of Princess Yoseok
 Grandfather - Kim Dal-bok (김달복, 金達福)
 Grandmother - Kim Jeong-hui (김정희, 金政姬) of the Gimhae Kim clan
 Aunt - Kim Heum-shin (김흠신, 金欽信), Lady Kim of the Gyeongju Kim clan
 Uncle - Kim Heum-dol (김흠돌, 金欽突) (? - 25 September 681)
 Cousin - Deposed Queen Kim of the Gyeongju Kim clan (폐비 김씨); King Sinmun’s former Queen Consort 
 Mother - Princess Yoseok of the Gyeongju Kim clan (요석공주)
 Grandfather - King Muyeol of Silla (무열왕) (603 - 661)
 Grandmother - Kim Bo-hui (김보희, 金寶姬), Lady Yeongchang (영창부인) of the Gimhae Kim clan
 Uncle - Kim Gaejimun (김개지문, 金皆知文)
 Uncle - Kim Ji-won (김지원, 金知元) 
 Stepfather - Wonhyo (원효) (617 - 686)
 Step grandfather - Seol Dam-nal (설담날) of the Gyeongju Seol clan 
 Step grandmother - Lady Jo of the Pohoe Jo clan (포회 조씨)
 Siblings 
 Younger half-brother - Seol Chung (설총) (658 - ?)
 Sister-in-law - Lady Yu of the Dancho Yu clan (단초 유씨, 丹草 庾氏)
 Sister-in-law - Lady No of the Gwangju No clan (광주 노씨)
 Half-nephew - Seol Hong-rin (설홍린, 薛洪鱗)
 Half-nephew - Seol Myeong-rin (설명린, 薛命鱗)
 Half-nephew - Seol Ho-rin (설호린, 薛好鱗)
 Husband - Kim Jeong-myeong, King Sinmun of Silla (신문왕) (? - 692)
 Mother-in-law - Queen Jaui of the Gyeongju Kim clan (자의왕후 김씨) (? - 681)
 Father-in-law - Kim Beob-min, King Munmu of Silla (문무왕) (626 - 21 July 681)
 Issue
Son - Kim Yi-hong, King Hyoso of Silla (효소왕) (687 - 702); was the 32nd monarch of Silla
Son - Kim Yong-gi, King Seongdeok of Silla (성덕왕) (? - 737); was the 33rd King of Silla
 Daughter-in-law - Queen Seongjeong of the Gyeongju Kim clan (성정왕후 김씨)
 Granddaughter - Lady Saso (사소부인)
 Grandson - Kim Jong-gyeong (김중경)
 Grandson - Kim Gyo-gak (김교각) (697 - 794)
 Daughter-in-law - Queen Sodeok of the Gyeongju Kim clan (소덕왕후 김씨)
 Grandson - Kim Seung-gyeong, King Hyoseong of Silla (효성왕) (? - 742)
 Grandson - Kim Heon-yeong, King Gyeongdeok of Silla (경덕왕) (? - 765)
Son - Kim Geun-jil (김근질, 金根質)
Son - Kim Sa–jong (김사종, 金詞宗)

References

7th-century women rulers
7th-century Korean women
8th-century women rulers
8th-century Korean women
Korean queens consort
Year of birth unknown
700 deaths
Royal consorts of Silla
Regents of Korea